Britney is the third studio album by American singer Britney Spears. It was released on October 31, 2001, by Jive Records.

Looking to transition from the teen pop styles of her first two studio albums ...Baby One More Time (1999) and Oops!... I Did It Again (2000), Spears began to embrace a significantly more mature sound with Britney. The record incorporates genres of pop and R&B with influences of EDM and occasionally dips into disco, hip hop, rock, and electronica. Its lyrical themes address the subjects such as coming of age, adulthood, control, and sexuality. Contributions to its production came from a variety of collaborators, including Max Martin and Rami Yacoub. Spears herself assumed a more prominent role in the album's development, co-writing six of its tracks.

Britney received generally mixed reviews from music critics, who complimented Spears' musical progression but criticized her increasingly provocative image. Regardless, the album was a global commercial success and debuted atop the US Billboard 200 with first-week sales of 746,000 copies, making Spears the first female artist to have her first three studio albums debut atop the chart, a record she would later break with her fourth studio album In the Zone (2003). The album received a nomination for Best Pop Vocal Album at the 45th Annual Grammy Awards (2003). With worldwide sales of over ten million copies, Britney is one of the best-selling albums of the 21st century.

Britney produced six singles. "I'm a Slave 4 U" reached the top ten in 20 countries but peaked only at number 27 on the US Billboard Hot 100, becoming Spears's first lead single not to peak within the top ten. "Overprotected" also achieved international commercial success but peaked only at number 86 the US Billboard Hot 100. "I'm Not a Girl, Not Yet a Woman", "I Love Rock 'n' Roll" and "Boys" reached the top ten in several countries but all failed to enter the US Billboard Hot 100, while "Anticipating" was released exclusively in France instead of "I Love Rock 'n' Roll". To further promote the album, Spears embarked on her fourth concert tour, titled Dream Within a Dream Tour, from November 2001 until July 2002.

Recording and production

For her second studio album Oops!... I Did It Again, which was released in May 2000 to global commercial success, Spears collaborated with producers such as Rodney Jerkins, Rami Yacoub, and Max Martin; all of them returned for Britney. Spears additionally worked with a variety of collaborators, including her then-boyfriend Justin Timberlake. She commented that she initially felt "awkward" and "nervous" working with Timberlake, saying that she was accustomed to the process being "like work".  For the first time, Spears worked with hip hop producers the Neptunes. She claimed to have been inspired by "a lot of hip-hop and R&B while I was on my last tour. I was inspired by Jay-Z and the Neptunes. I told Jive I really wanted to work with [the Neptunes]. I wanted to make [Britney] nastier and funkier." Spears was additionally set to record songs with Missy Elliott and Timbaland, which never came to fruition due to scheduling conflicts.

While recording Britney, Spears wanted an "older generation to pick up on it", adding that she "had to change it up and pray people think that's cool". She stated that she chose to self-title the album because the majority of its content described herself. Spears recorded 23 tracks for the album, several of which she co-wrote with the assistance of Brian Kierulf and Josh Schwartz. She added that personally writing the album and developing its concept made the project "that much more special", elaborating of her intentions to "get better and grow" as a songwriter. During the sessions, Spears also worked with electronic musician BT, whose tracks were excluded from the standard edition track listing. She stated: "I was really disappointed we weren't able to use the tracks BT had done. He's a genius in whatever he does, but the type of music he ended up doing didn't fit me and what I was going for. I think they will be on some of the stuff [released] overseas." However, his contribution "Before the Goodbye" was included on international editions of the album.

Music and lyrics

Britney is a pop and R&B record with dance influences. It opens with the urban and Middle Eastern-influenced "I'm a Slave 4 U", which showcases breathy, emotive noises, and has been compared to  "Nasty Girl" by Vanity 6. Spears commented that its lyrics are "about me just wanting to go out and forget who I am and dance and have a good time". Europop-styled "Overprotected" addresses a girl tired of being manipulated. Lyrically, "Lonely" sees a girl moving on from a troublesome romance after being lied to and manipulated, being considered "a teenage version" of Janet Jackson's "What About". The soft rock piano ballad "I'm Not a Girl, Not Yet a Woman", co-written by English singer-songwriter Dido, details the emotional struggles girls experience during puberty. "Boys" incorporates R&B and hip hop styles, and was criticized by David Browne of Entertainment Weekly as "cut-rate '80s Janet Jackson". The disco-inspired track "Anticipating" discusses the friendship and camaraderie between women, and was described as reminiscent of Madonna's "Holiday" and "Kylie in disco mood."

Spears' cover of "I Love Rock 'n' Roll", made famous by Joan Jett and the Blackhearts, infuses pop rock styles into the original hard rock rendition. "Cinderella" reflects on a female protagonist who left her boyfriend after he failed to appreciate her efforts in the relationship. "Let Me Be" sees Spears ask to be trusted as an adult and be afforded her own opinions. "Bombastic Love" discusses a love in which the protagonist feels that the romance will happen "exactly like in a movie". Similarly, "That's Where You Take Me" details the joy she gets from an emotionally fulfilling relationship, amid Middle Eastern chimes and a collage of electronic beats and drum programming. On the electronica international editions bonus track "When I Found You", Spears sings about having found the "deepest love" in her soulmate who is essentially a reflection of herself. Britney closes with "What It's Like to Be Me", which was co-written and co-produced by Spears's then-boyfriend Justin Timberlake; Spears sings that a guy must "figure [her] out" to "be [her] man".

Release and promotion

On January 28, 2001, Spears performed at Super Bowl XXXV. Shortly after, she appeared on Total Request Live to premiere new material from Britney. On September 6, Spears premiered "I'm a Slave 4 U" at the 2001 MTV Video Music Awards; the performance was criticized for her use of a yellow python as a stage prop. Four days later, she performed "I'm a Slave 4 U" on The Rosie O'Donnell Show. Spears was scheduled to perform and hold a press conference in Australia on September 13; however, she cancelled the event in light of the September 11 attacks two days prior, saying that holding the conference would have been inappropriate. The following month, Spears performed at The Tonight Show with Jay Leno.

Britney was first released in Japan on October 31, being released in the United States on November 6, by Jive Records. An accompanying video album, titled Britney: The Videos, was released two weeks later. It included a selection of her earlier music videos, behind-the-scenes footage, commercials, and notable live performances. The video peaked atop the US Top Music Videos on December 8.
Spears had already begun her Dream Within a Dream Tour in Columbus, Ohio five days before Britney was released in the US; the tour ended on July 28, 2002 in Mexico City. Shortly after it began, she performed in her first HBO concert special from the MGM Grand Garden Arena in Las Vegas; Cher was supposed to join Spears onstage for the song "The Beat Goes On", which Spears covered on ...Baby One More Time, but was unable to do so due to scheduling conflicts.

On December 4, 2001, Spears performed at the 2001 Billboard Music Awards in Las Vegas. On January 9, 2002, she performed "I'm Not a Girl, Not Yet a Woman" at the 2002 American Music Awards. Later that month, Spears gave interviews to The Frank Skinner Show in the United Kingdom and The Saturday Show in Australia. Crossroads premiered in February, allowing Spears to simultaneously promote both the film and her album. On February 2, she was featured as both the host and performer on Saturday Night Live. A week later, she performed "I'm Not a Girl, Not Yet a Woman" at the NBA All-Star Game and The Tonight Show with Jay Leno. Spears also appeared on Live with Regis and Kelly, The View, and the 44th Annual Grammy Awards, as well as the German talk show Wetten, dass..?.

Singles

Britney became Spears' first album not to produce a single US Billboard Hot 100 top-ten hit. Reportedly, Clear Channel Entertainment "punished" Spears for her management not choosing them as the tour promoter for the Dream Within a Dream Tour by blacklisting her on their radio stations, which greatly affected the performance of her subsequent singles, starting with "I'm a Slave 4 U". The song was released as the album's lead single on September 25, 2001 to critical acclaim. Due to the radio blacklist, it peaked only at number 27 on the US Billboard Hot 100, becoming Spears' first lead single not to peak within the top ten. It fared better internationally, debuting at number four on the UK Singles Chart and peaking within the top ten in 20 countries. Its accompanying music video was directed by Francis Lawrence, and received three nominations at the 2002 MTV Video Music Awards.

"Overprotected" was released as the second international single from Britney on December 10, 2001, and the third North American single on April 2, 2002. Its Darkchild  remix peaked at number 86 on the US Billboard Hot 100, while the original version reached the top ten in Belgium, Croatia, Finland, Greece, Hungary, Ireland, Italy, Norway, Poland, Romania, Sweden and the United Kingdom. Critically acclaimed, the song was nominated for the Best Female Pop Vocal Performance at the 45th Annual Grammy Awards (2003). Two accompanying music videos were released–the Bille Woodruff-directed video for the original version and the Chris Applebaum-directed Darkchild remix video.

Staggered to fit the varying release dates of Crossroads internationally, "I'm Not a Girl, Not Yet a Woman" was released as the film's theme song and the second North American single from Britney on January 7, 2002 to critical acclaim. It peaked at number two on the Bubbling Under Hot 100 Singles, the Billboard Hot 100 extension chart. The song fared better internationally, peaking at number two in the UK, and within the top ten in Australia, Austria, the Czech Republic, Germany, Ireland, the Netherlands and Sweden. Filmed in Arizona and at the Alstrom Point, the song's Wayne Isham-directed accompanying music video primarily consists of Spears, whilst wearing cowboy boots, performing the song whilst standing on the edge of a cliff, and inside a slot canyon.

"I Love Rock 'n' Roll" was released as the fourth international single from Britney on May 27, 2002, and the fifth and final UK single on November 4, to mixed critical reception. It reached the top ten in Austria, Croatia, Germany, Hungary, Ireland, Portugal, Scotland and Slovenia, whilst peaking at number 13 on the UK Singles Chart. Directed by Chris Applebaum, its accompanying music video shows Spears with her own band, a stack of speakers and flashing lights. In France,  "Anticipating" was released as the fourth single instead of "I Love Rock 'n' Roll" on June 25; it reached number 38 on the French Singles Chart.

The Co-Ed Remix of "Boys"–featuring Pharrell Williams–was released as the fourth North American and UK single, and the fifth and final international single from Britney on June 24, 2002, also serving as the second single from the soundtrack for Austin Powers in Goldmember, to mixed critical reception. It peaked at number 22 on the US Bubbling Under Hot 100 Singles, and peaked at number seven on the UK Singles Chart. Its accompanying music video, directed by Dave Meyers, features Spears, Williams, and Mike Myers as Austin Powers at a party inside a castle, with cameo appearances from actors Jason Priestley, Justin Bruening and Taye Diggs. It was nominated for Best Video from a Film at the 2003 MTV Video Music Awards, but lost to Eminem's "Lose Yourself".

Critical reception

Britney received mixed reviews from music critics. At Metacritic, which assigns a normalized rating out of 100 to reviews from mainstream critics, Britney received an average score of 58, which indicates "mixed or average reviews", based on 13 reviews. David Browne of Entertainment Weekly found Spears's increasingly provocative image to be unnatural, noting "virginal vamping in an awkward adolescence" and "a few tentative new moves". PopMatters Nikki Tranton complimented the production of the songs, but questioned if Spears was ready to establish herself as a grown woman in the music industry. Sal Cinquemani of Slant Magazine agreed, writing that although "Britney, [the album], fills her role of guilty pleasure (the disc certainly satiates more than the stunted growth of last year's Oops!...I Did It Again), it's time for Spears to quit being such a cock-tease and cook something up that will satisfy the ever-vacillating hype-machine."

AllMusic's Stephen Thomas Erlewine gave a positive review, feeling that the album "strives to deepen [Spears's] persona" and proves she "will know what to do when the teen-pop phenomenon of 1999–2001 passes for good". Similarly, a reviewer from Billboard commented that the project was "a nicely varied, wholly satisfying collection". Chris Heat of Dotmusic praised Britney for "us[ing] this opportunity to take the odd risk and adds a welcome edge to her sound." NMEs Ted Kessler recognized the release as a "coming of age album" and joked that it "works best when making a good pop cheese and dance sandwich". By contrast, Stephen Thompson of The A.V. Club panned the album, opining that the music "just [isn't] catchy" and that "though neither a girl nor a woman, Spears inspires grown-up anger on her own". Craig Seymore of Spin recognized that she "sound[s] almost human," but criticized that "the rest of the record is as coldly anthemic as ever."

Accolades

|-
! scope="row"| 2001
| Billboard Music Award
| Female Albums Artist of the Year
| Britney Spears
| 
| align="center"| 
|-
! scope="row"| 2003
| Grammy Award
| Best Pop Vocal Album
| Britney
| 
| align="center"| 
|}

Commercial performance
Britney debuted at number one on the US Billboard 200 with first-week sales of 745,750 copies, which was the second highest first week sales by a female artist at the time behind Spears' own Oops!... I Did It Again which sold 1.3 million copies in its first week. In doing so, Spears became the first woman to have her first three studio albums debut atop that chart. She also held the second-highest debut album sales of 2001, behind Celebrity by NSYNC with 1.88 million units moved and was the highest debut-week sales by a female artist of the year. After fluctuating within the top 20 of the chart in the following weeks, Britney sold 3.3 million copies by March 2002. As of March 2015, Britney has sold 4.4 million units in the United States alone and was certified quadruple platinum by the Recording Industry Association of America (RIAA).

Internationally, Britney debuted atop the Canadian Albums Chart with first-week sales of 44,550 copies. It later sold 316,944 copies in the country, a significant decline in relation to the sales of ...Baby One More Time (1999) and Oops!... I Did It Again (2000). The album peaked at number four on both the Oricon Albums Chart in Japan and the UK Albums Chart. In the latter, it was certified platinum by the British Phonographic Industry (BPI) for shipments of 300,000 copies to retailers. Across the rest of Europe, Britney debuted at number one in Austria, Germany, and Switzerland. In 2002, it was certified double platinum by the International Federation of the Phonographic Industry (IFPI) for shipments of two million copies throughout Europe. The album also peaked at number four in Australia, and was certified double platinum by the Australian Recording Industry Association (ARIA). Britney was the fifth best-selling album of 2001 globally, selling seven million copies. By January 2003, the album had sold ten million copies worldwide.

Track listing

Notes
 "I Love Rock 'n' Roll" is a cover of the 1975 Arrows single later made famous by Joan Jett & the Blackhearts in their 1982 cover of the song.
 signifies a vocal producer.

Personnel
Credits are adapted from the liner notes of Britney.

John Amatiello – engineering (tracks 2 and 4), engineering assistance (tracks 8 and 10)
Dido Armstrong – songwriting (track 4)
James Biondolillo – string arrangement (track 6)
BossLady – backing vocals (tracks 2 and 10)
Sue Ann Carwell – backing vocals (track 7)
Andrew Coleman – engineering (tracks 1 and 5)
Tyler Collins – backing vocals (track 7)
Tom Coyne – mastering
Jaime Duncan – engineering assistance (track 12)
Brian Garten – engineering (track 1 and 5)
Stephen George – mixing (track 6)
Serban Ghenea – mixing (tracks 1 and 5)
Brad Gilderman – engineering (track 7)
Albert Hall – backing vocals (track 7)
Damion Hall – backing vocals (track 7)
Nana Hedin – backing vocals (track 10)
Jean-Marie Horvat – mixing (tracks 3, 7 and 9)
Rodney Jerkins – drum programming (tracks 3 and 9), production (tracks 3, 7 and 9), songwriting (track 3)
Richard G. Johnson – engineering assistance (track 12)
Jennifer Karr – backing vocals (tracks 3, 6, 9 and 11)
Steven Klein – photography
Marc Stephen Lee – engineering assistance (track 7)
Thomas Lindberg – bass (track 4)
Fabian Marasciullo – engineering (tracks 3 and 7), vocal engineering (track 9)
Max Martin – backing vocals (track 4), engineering (tracks 2, 4, 8 and 10), guitar (track 2), mixing (tracks 2, 4, 8 and 10), production (tracks 2, 4, 8 and 10)
Charles McCrorey – engineering assistance (tracks 2, 4, 6, 9 and 12)
Daniel Milazzo – engineering assistance (track 5)
Pablo Munguia – engineering (track 12)
The Neptunes – instruments (track 1 and 5), production (tracks 1 and 5), songwriting (tracks 1 and 5)
Esbjörn Öhrwall – guitar (track 4)
Jeanette Olsson – backing vocals (tracks 4 and 8)
Jeff Pescetto – backing vocals (track 7)
Tim Roberts – engineering assistance (tracks 1 and 5)
Wade Robson – production (track 12), songwriting (track 12)
Nile Rodgers – guitar (track 6)
Jason Scheff – backing vocals (track 7)
Ryan Smith – engineering assistance (track 1)
Britney Spears – conceptualization, songwriting (tracks 3, 6, 8, 9 and 11), vocals (all tracks)
Mark Suozzo – string arrangement (track 6)
Rich Tapper – engineering assistance (track 11)
Jill Tengan – engineering assistance (tracks 3, 6 and 9)
Chris Thompson – backing vocals (track 7)
Justin Timberlake – backing vocals (track 12), production (track 12), songwriting (track 12), vocal arrangement (track 12)
Michael Tucker – engineering (track 2), mixing (track 11)
Rami Yacoub – engineering (tracks 2, 4, 8 and 10), mixing (tracks 2, 4, 8 and 10), production (tracks 2, 4, 8 and 10), songwriting (tracks 2, 4, 8 and 10)
Yasu – engineering (track 6)

Charts

Weekly charts

Monthly charts

Year-end charts

Decade-end charts

Certifications and sales

Release history

See also
 Britney Spears discography
 List of Billboard 200 number-one albums of 2001
 List of number-one albums of 2001 (Canada)
 List of number-one hits of 2001 (Germany)
 List of best-selling albums by women
 List of best-selling albums of the 21st century

Notes

References

External links
 
 
 Britney at Metacritic

2001 albums
Britney Spears albums
Jive Records albums
Albums produced by Rodney Jerkins
Albums produced by Justin Timberlake
Albums produced by Max Martin
Albums produced by the Neptunes
Albums produced by Rami Yacoub
Albums recorded at Westlake Recording Studios
Contemporary R&B albums by American artists